= Persianhaha =

Iranian TV show

- Country of origin: Iran

Original release
- Network: Fairfax Public Access); Arlington Public Access; Montgomery Community TV; Omide Iran TV Network

PersianHaHa is an entertaining, non-political, Weekly Iranian TV show for Iranian-Americans. Segments include; Zeperti, a Persian version of the Jeopardy! game show, hosted by the comedian, Tehran. Nasle Ma, a talk show about the challenges of the Iranian youth in the United States. Studio Kheyabani, street interviews with Iranians on cultural topics. Raghs Kheyabani, public dance segments around Washington DC sharing ethnic music with Iranians and Americans. Pokht O Goft, an Iranian cooking talk show (coming soon). Gharibeh, an Iranian soap opera (coming soon). Persianhaha is on FPA (Fairfax Public Access), AIM (Arlington Public Access), MCT (Montgomery Community TV), and OITN (Omide Iran TV Network).
